Tafsir Roshan (Persian: تفسیر روشن / Clear Explanation) is an exegesis on the Quran written by Mirza Hassan Mostafavi in Persian in sixteen volumes during the 20th century. The commentator has used a lexicological approach in his book and emphasizes on the idea that Quranic words are metaphoric. The book targets common people from different backgrounds.

References 
 Bahaeddin Khorramshahi, Encyclopedia of Quranic research, vol. 1, p. 704
 Bahaeddin Khorramshahi, Encyclopedia of Quranic research, vol. 2, p. 2075

Shia tafsir